Dizajrud-e Gharbi Rural District is in the Central District of Ajab Shir County, East Azerbaijan province, Iran. At the census of 2006, its population was 12,347 in 3,035 households; there were 15,857 inhabitants in 3,443 households at the following census of 2011; and in the most recent census of 2016, the population of the rural district was 12,748 in 2,505 households. The largest of its 18 villages was the 03 Ajabshir Recruit Training Centre, with 5,423 people.

References 

Ajab Shir County

Rural Districts of East Azerbaijan Province

Populated places in East Azerbaijan Province

Populated places in Ajab Shir County